Carlos Valverde may refer to:
Carlos Valverde (footballer, born 1985), Spanish footballer
Carlos Valverde (footballer, born 1988), Spanish footballer